The Imbrian is a lunar geologic period divided into two epochs, the Early and Late.

Early Imbrian
In the lunar geologic timescale, the Early Imbrian epoch occurred from 3,850 million years ago to about 3,800 million years ago. It overlaps the end of the Late Heavy Bombardment of the Inner Solar System. The impact that created the huge Mare Imbrium basin occurred at the start of the epoch. The other large basins that dominate the lunar near side (such as Mare Crisium, Mare Tranquillitatis, Mare Serenitatis, and Mare Fecunditatis) were also formed in this period. These basins filled with basalt mostly during the subsequent Late Imbrian epoch. The Early Imbrian was preceded by the Nectarian.

Late Imbrian

In the Lunar geologic timescale, the Late Imbrian epoch occurred between 3800 million years ago to about 3200 million years ago. It was the epoch during which the mantle below the lunar basins partially melted and filled them with basalt.  The melting is thought to have occurred because the impacts of the Early Imbrian thinned the overlying rock – either causing the mantle to rise because of the reduced pressure on it, bringing molten material closer to the surface, or the top melting as heat flowed upwards through the mantle because of reduced overlying thermal insulation.  The majority of lunar samples returned to earth for study come from this epoch.

The Earth equivalent consists of half of the Archean eon.

Relationship to Earth's geologic time scale
Since little or no geological evidence on Earth exists from the time spanned by the Early and Late Imbrian epoch of the Moon, the Early and Late Imbrian has been used by at least one notable scientific work as an unofficial subdivision of the terrestrial Hadean eon.

See also

References

 
04